Bennett Memorial Diocesan School is an all ability co-educational academy in Royal Tunbridge Wells, Kent, England, which caters for students from age 11 to 18.

History
The school was founded on 17 October 1951 by Lady Elena Bennett of Matfield and Christopher M. Chavasse Bishop of Rochester. Lady Bennett donated the funding for the school in memory of her late husband, Sir Thomas Bennett.

Lady Bennett herself designed the school’s coat of arms. The badger was chosen by Lady Bennett, because her maiden name was Brooke-Jones (which reminded her of brock, a name for a badger) as well as often seeing badgers around the school site. She also chose the school’s motto, Semper Tenax, because she believed the school would always hold on to the Christian values she had founded it to teach.

The school opened to 400 students and only 18 teachers on 8 January 1953. In 1976 Bennett became a comprehensive school, welcoming students of all abilities from a large part of the Diocese of Rochester rather than just Tunbridge Wells. It was shortly after this time that the Bennett sixth form was opened for A-Level students. Over the years students have travelled from as far away as Aylesford and Robertsbridge. A huge turning point in the School's life happened in 1993 when Bennett introduced boys into Year 7. In 2003 Bennett Memorial achieved specialist school status as a technology college. In April 2011, Bennett Memorial Diocesan School gained 'Academy' status, bringing with it new freedom and opportunity. In 2012 Bennett achieved an Outstanding judgment from Ofsted.

Pupils from the school were chosen to form part of a "guard of honour" for athletes at the opening ceremony of the 2012 Olympic Games, displaying artistic creations their school made to celebrate the event.

In 2012, the school unveiled plans for a new sixth form centre. Construction of the 'Sixth Form Study Centre' commenced in March 2013, and opened to staff and students in January 2014.

In February 2014 the Education Secretary Michael Gove officially opened the new sixth form block.

The 3G Pitch was built in 2017 so that rugby and football could be played in any weather conditions.

In 2020, a Brand-New building, which was named the Rochester building, was opened.

Form system
The school holds a house system used in every year.  Each house is named after bishops of Rochester:

Facilities
The school has various buildings, where some focus on classrooms for particular subjects.

Coat of Arms

References

External links
 Bennett Memorial Diocesan School - Official School Website
 Bennett Sixth Form - Official Sixth Form Link

Church of England secondary schools in the Diocese of Rochester
Academies in Kent
Schools in Royal Tunbridge Wells
Educational institutions established in 1951
Secondary schools in Kent
1951 establishments in England